Zenoni is a surname. Notable people with the surname include:

Damiano Zenoni (born 1977), Italian footballer
Cristian Zenoni (born 1977), Italian footballer
Kyle Zenoni (born 1984), American soccer player

See also
Zenonis, Byzantine empress

Italian-language surnames